The women's 400 metres competition at the 2012 Summer Olympics in London, United Kingdom. The event was held at the Olympic Stadium on 3–5 August.

London rains became a part of the qualifying round, where the favorites tried to make the final with minimum effort. 52.11 was the slowest time qualifier, though Tjipekapora Herunga managed a 52.31 for the slowest automatic qualifier.

In the semi-final, the weather was better.  In the first semi, Sanya Richards-Ross was matched with the defending champion Christine Ohuruogu, with only two automatic qualifiers. At the gun, Richards-Ross took off, making up most of the stagger on Krivoshapka to her immediate outside.  Relaxing the backstretch but exploding on the second turn, Richards-Ross had built up a huge lead, then slowed considerably on the home stretch letting Ohuruogu gain almost all the lead back. The second semi turned into a match race between Francena McCorory and world champion Amantle Montsho, running stride for stride together far ahead of the others until Montsho dipped to place first.  The third semi was a much faster affair.  2012 World leader Antonina Krivoshapka took the race out as if it were the final, making up the stagger during the first turn and coming off the turn with a huge lead. She also slowed on the homestretch and looked to struggle to hold off DeeDee Trotter and Novlene Williams-Mills. Third place Williams-Mills became a time qualifier faster than the previous two heats.

In the final, unlike the memorable race four years earlier, where Richards-Ross burned herself out building a huge lead, this time Krivoshapka had the large lead through the halfway mark and held it to the home stretch, with the three Americans spread across the track a step behind.  McCorory and Krivoshapka began to struggle as first Trotter, then Richards-Ross seized the lead which she would not relinquish. Before the home crowd, Ohuruogu approached the finish line with a trademark late surge, coming from several steps off the pace to catch Deedee Trotter for the silver medal, Trotter holding on for the bronze.

Competition format
The women's 400m competition consisted of heats (Round 1), Semifinals and a Final.

Records
, the existing World and Olympic records were as follows.

Schedule

All times are British Summer Time (UTC+1)

Heats

Entrants as of 27 July 2012.

Qual. rule: first 3 of each heat (Q) plus the 3 fastest times (q) qualified.

Heat 1

Heat 2

Heat 3

Heat 4

Heat 5

Heat 6

Heat 7

Jennifer Padilla originally finished in third place with a time of 51.74, but was disqualified due to lane infringement. As a result, Marlena Wesh moved up to third position to qualify for the semi-finals.

Semi-finals

Qual. rule: first 2 of each heat (Q) plus the 2 fastest times (q) qualified.

Heat 1

Heat 2

Heat 3

Final

References

Athletics at the 2012 Summer Olympics
400 metres at the Olympics
2012 in women's athletics
Women's events at the 2012 Summer Olympics